Nikolai Tsvetkov (born 1960) is a Russian oligarch, the founder and president of Nikoil Financial. , with a wealth of $1.8 billion, he was the world's 397th-richest person.

He is a graduate of the Zhukovsky Air Force Engineering Academy. As an army officer, he served in Tambov, Moscow, and Russia's far east and fought in Afghanistan. Tsvetkov attained the rank of lieutenant colonel, before he retired, founding the brokerage firm Brokinvest. His obscure company became the investment and financial adviser to Lukoil (then a state-controlled concern) by offering a co-ownership to its president Vagit Alekperov, and profited immensely from the voucher privatization scheme of Russia's state-owned companies in the mid-1990s.

References

External links 

Living people
1959 births
Russian billionaires
Soviet Army officers